Sandy Poulsen (born July 24, 1952) is a retired American alpine skier who competed in the 1972 Winter Olympics.

External links
 sports-reference.com

1952 births
Living people
American female alpine skiers
Olympic alpine skiers of the United States
Alpine skiers at the 1972 Winter Olympics
People from San Francisco
21st-century American women